Jack Bond may refer to:

 Jack Bond (cricketer) (1932–2019), English cricketer
 Jack Bond (director) (born 1939), British film producer and director